Dolly Takes a Chance (Swedish: Dolly tar chansen) is a 1944 Swedish comedy film directed by Gustaf Edgren and starring Marguerite Viby, Karl-Arne Holmsten and Lasse Krantz. A separate Danish version Teatertosset was also made.

The film's sets were designed by Arne Åkermark.

Synopsis
An aspiring actress, currently working as a waitress, tries to land a big stage role.

Main cast
 Marguerite Viby as Dolly Holm  
 Karl-Arne Holmsten as Knut Lambert  
 Lasse Krantz as Adrian Brummer  
 Hjördis Petterson as Nanna Sten  
 John Botvid as Lund  
 Ludde Gentzel as Vogel  
 Rune Halvarsson as Hasse Frank  
 Göte Ahrnbring as Ludde  
 Julia Cæsar as Antonia Nero  
 Douglas Håge as Remover

References

Bibliography 
 Per Olov Qvist & Peter von Bagh. Guide to the Cinema of Sweden and Finland. Greenwood Publishing Group, 2000.

External links 
 

1944 films
Swedish comedy films
1944 comedy films
1940s Swedish-language films
Films directed by Gustaf Edgren
Remakes of Danish films
Swedish black-and-white films
1940s Swedish films